"Orinoco Flow", also released as "Orinoco Flow (Sail Away)", is a song by Irish singer-songwriter Enya from her second studio album, Watermark (1988). It was released on 3 October 1988 by WEA Records in the United Kingdom and by Geffen Records in the United States the following year. The song topped the UK Singles Chart for three weeks and received two Grammy Award nominations for Best Music Video and Best New Age Performance at the 32nd Annual Grammy Awards. 

The Guardian ranked "Orinoco Flow" number 77 in its list of the 100 greatest UK number-one singles of all time in 2020.

Background
The song was released as the lead single from Enya's studio album Watermark on 3 October 1988. It became a global success, reaching number one in several countries, including Belgium, Ireland, the Netherlands, Switzerland and the United Kingdom, where it stayed at the top of the UK Singles Chart for three weeks. In the United States, the song peaked at number 24 on the Billboard Hot 100 in April 1989.

The title of the song is an allusion both to Orinoco Studios (now Miloco Studios), where it was recorded, and to the river of the same name. Its pizzicato chords, generated by altering the Roland D-50 synthesizer's "Pizzagogo" patch, are highly recognizable as a new-age sound. Enya was signed to WEA by Rob Dickins, who served as executive producer of Watermark, and the song pays homage to Dickins in the line "with Rob Dickins at the wheel". Co-producer Ross Cullum is referenced in the song with a pun on Ross Dependency: "We can sigh, say goodbye / Ross and his dependencies".

Lyrics
The lyrics have been likened to "an itinerary for the most expensive gap year of all time", mentioning an array of locations like a "global geography lesson". Locations mentioned in the song include Fiji, Tiree, Peru, Bali, and Cebu.

Legacy 
In 1994, the song was licensed to Virgin Records for the best-selling new-age music compilation album Pure Moods, which contributed to further exposure and "helped provide a multi-platinum bonanza" to the record company.

In 1998, a special-edition 10th-anniversary remix single was released.

In a 2015 interview with The Irish Times, Enya said: “Longevity is all any artist dreams of”, rather than to dwell on how her songs are remembered. She credits "Orinoco Flow" for some of her cross-generational appeal, saying: "people who used to like Orinoco Flow are now playing my music to their children". In another interview, when asked whether people bring up "Orinoco Flow", she responded: "people say 'sail away' to me or whistle bits of it back to me. I think it’s wonderful I never tire of it."

Critical reception
Ned Raggett from AllMusic described the song as "distinct" and "downright catchy". He noted "its implicit dramatics, [that] gently charges instead of piling things on".

Music video
A music video was made to accompany the song. It features Enya singing the song in front of footage of rivers, flowers and nature, edited to have the appearance of a painting. It was directed by Michael Geoghegan.

Track listings

Charts

Weekly charts

Year-end charts

Certifications

Covers

 Celtic Woman – Celtic Woman and Celtic Woman: A New Journey and Celtic Woman: Emerald - Musical Gems and Celtic Woman: Destiny
 Libera – New Dawn
 Big Black Delta – Orinoco Symphony

Samples and remixes
 Samples of the backing track are used in Rebel MC's hit single "Tribal Bass" (1991)
 Maicol & Manuel sampled the chords in their song "No Hay Ley"

In popular culture
 
After a significant wave of popularity, including a regular rotation on MTV, the song became "a punch line", representing a new-age cliché of "generic 'bubble bath' music". The song was used in scenes depicting relaxation and to highlight this in a joking manner. In the 1997 South Park episode "Death", Stan's grandfather locks Stan in a room and plays a parody of the song performed by Toddy Walters to illustrate what it feels like to be old.

In the Brooklyn Nine-Nine episode "Crime and Punishment", character Jake Peralta mentions Enya as one of his favorite musical artists. Later on, "Orinoco Flow" plays as he walks, in slow-motion, into a courtroom. Regarding the use of "Orinoco Flow" in Brooklyn Nine-Nine, producer Dan Goor remarked that “We weren’t trying to attach ourselves to a history of making fun of it. The joke was just that it’s 100 percent the wrong music to play. It’s supposed to be this triumphant, badass moment, and instead we’re playing that song.”

In the 2002 I'm Alan Partridge episode "The Talented Mr. Alan", Alan is caught singing the song to himself. The song is in "Funeral", the sixth episode of the first series of Peep Show; the music video is shown during the episode, and the song plays over the end credits. The song is played during Rumpelstiltskin's announcement scene in the 2010 film Shrek Forever After. It is also in the first season of Cougar Town. The song was also used as the title song for the Netflix comedy-drama series Living with Yourself starring Paul Rudd and Aisling Bea. 

Alternatively, the song is also used in media to create a dissonance between the calmness of the song and starkly contrasting visuals. The song is featured during a sequence in David Fincher's 2011 adaptation of the novel The Girl with the Dragon Tattoo, in which the secondary protagonist is tortured while the song plays. In the Black Mirror episode "Hated in the Nation", one of the characters listens to the song to relax, "shortly before she’s torn apart by murderous drones" and effectively returned "Orinoco Flow" to the top of the new-age charts after the episode was released.

An exception to this is the use of the song in the 2018 Bo Burnham film Eighth Grade. Burnham wrote to Enya directly for permission to use the song, and recognized it as a serious choice for the film; "in Eighth Grade, 'Orinoco Flow' finally gets to be itself" rather than "fodder for ironic laughs".

Other uses
 A version of the song is performed by the main character of Moone Boy when he and his friend are sailing on a homemade raft.
 Australian television show Please Like Me features this song in the opening scene of the first episode of its fourth season.
 The song was featured in the 2018 animated film Hotel Transylvania 3: Summer Vacation.
 The song was played in the background during a scene in the 6th episode of season 2 of The Boys, when A-Train was being recruited to the Church of the Collective.
 The song was featured in the 2021 film The Boss Baby: Family Business.

Advertisement
 In 1991, the song featured in an advert for Dulux paint.
 In 1992, the song was featured in a series of ads for Crystal Light beverage mixes. 
 The song is played towards the end of Hyundai Santa Fe ad (2021) in Australia.

Other references
"Orinoco Flow" has also been used in reference to various object names including an iris cultivar Orinoco Flow by iris breeder Cy Bartlett in 1989, and Leporinus enyae, a species of fish from the Orinoco drainage basin named for the artist herself.

In the 2017 ITV tribute to Diana, Princess of Wales, Diana, Our Mother: Her Life and Legacy, Prince Harry recalls his mother listening to Enya driving in her BMW with the top down.

References

External links

Songs about boats
Songs about rivers
Songs about oceans and seas
1988 songs
1988 singles
1989 singles
Enya songs
Number-one singles in Belgium
European Hot 100 Singles number-one singles
Irish Singles Chart number-one singles
Dutch Top 40 number-one singles
Number-one singles in Switzerland
UK Singles Chart number-one singles
Songs with lyrics by Roma Ryan
Songs with music by Enya
Geffen Records singles
Warner Music Group singles
Music videos directed by Michael Geoghegan